Maloum is the sixth Arabic language album by Nawal Al Zoghbi, released in 1999 produced by Relax-In international.  It was released 1 year after the previous album Mandam Aleik. The biggest hit of this album remains "Dal'ouna" which was one of the best songs of the year 1999. Nawal sang this song on various TV shows including "Ya Leil Ya Ein", "A tribute to Lebanese President", "LBCI Anniversary Show" and "New Year's Eve Special" on MTV.

Track listing

Music videos

 Ghayarli hayati
 Maloum (I don't blame you)
This shows Nawal running everywhere including Paris and a stranded island from her lover who was stalking her.
Video on YouTube
 Dal'ouna
Nawal is surrounded by dancers with the Greek them, the video was filmed in Prague.
 Tia
Tia, Nawal's daughter is in the video and it shows a lot of Nawal's touchable moments with her one and only daughter.

Versions 

 Three years after the release of this album, the bosnian singer Selma Bajrami made a bosnian version of Maloum entitled "Žena sirena" (Mermaid woman), that was released as part of the tracklist of her 2002 album, entitled Žena sa Balkana.

References

1998 albums
Arabic-language albums
Nawal Al Zoghbi albums
1999 albums